Gabino Díaz Merchán (26 February 1926 – 14 June 2022) was a Spanish Roman Catholic prelate, theologian, and philosopher who has been Archbishop of Oviedo from 1969 to 2002 and the President of Episcopal Conference of Spain from 1981 to 1987.

Biography 
He was born in the city of Toledo on 26 February 1926. He entered the seminary and studied at the seminary in Toledo. He was ordained as priest in 1952 and then he went to Comillas Pontifical University, where he studied both Theology and Philosophy, receiving master's degree and doctorate. On 23 July 1965 Pope Paul VI appointed him bishop of Guadix. He received his episcopal consecration on 22 August. On 4 August 1969 Pope Paul VI named him Archbishop of Oviedo. He was installed there on 20 September 1969. In 1981 The Episcopal Conference of Spain elected him as its president. On 2002 he sent his letter of resignation as Archbishop of Oviedo to Pope John Paul II and it was accepted by Pope John Paul II. Carlos Osoro Sierra was appointed his successor in January 2002.

References

External links 
 Díaz Merchán, que usa ordenador con 91 años, pide evangelizar también a los creyentes 
 Episcopologio 
 «La iglesia tiene hoy que ser más misionera, incluso con los propios cristianos» 
 https://www.spain.info/en/places-of-interest/museum-church/
 https://m.wikidata.org/wiki/Q4357931

1926 births
2022 deaths
20th-century Roman Catholic bishops in Spain
21st-century Roman Catholic bishops in Spain
Bishops of Oviedo
Bishops appointed by Pope Paul VI
People from Toledo, Spain